is a Japanese manga series written by Aoi Akashiro and illustrated by Sonshō Hangetsuban. It has been serialized in Hero's Inc.'s seinen manga magazine Monthly Hero's from May 2019 to October 2020, before transferring to the Comiplex website since November 2020. The series has been collected into six tankōbon volumes as of November 2022. An anime television series adaptation by Studio Palette is set to premiere in April 2023.

Characters

Media

Manga
Written by Aoi Akashiro and illustrated by Sonshō Hangetsuban, KamiKatsu: Working for God in a Godless World began serialization on Hero's Inc.'s seinen manga magazine Monthly Hero's on May 1, 2019. The series was transferred to the Comiplex website on November 27, 2020, after Monthly Hero's ceased publication on October 30 of the same year. As of November 2022, six tankōbon volumes have been released.

A spin-off manga with composition by Shinya Murata and illustrated by Tokisada Hayami, titled , began serialization on the Comiplex website on November 25, 2022.

Volume list

Anime
An anime television series adaptation was announced on April 26, 2022. It is produced by Studio Palette and directed by Yuki Inaba, with Yoshifumi Sueda serving as supervisor, Aoi Akashiro handling the scripts, and Kaori Yoshikawa designing the characters. The series is set to premiere on April 6, 2023, on Tokyo MX and other networks. The opening theme song is "I Wish" by Rin Kurusu, while the ending theme song is "Steppin' Up Life!" by Akari Kitō.

On March 19, 2023, Crunchyroll announced that they licensed the series outside of Asia.

References

External links
  
  
 

2023 anime television series debuts
Anime series based on manga
Crunchyroll anime
Fantasy anime and manga
Fiction about cults
Isekai anime and manga
Japanese webcomics
Seinen manga
Shogakukan manga
Upcoming anime television series
Webcomics in print